James White (13 June 1942 – 26 July 2017) was an English professional footballer. He played for Bournemouth & Boscombe Athletic, Portsmouth, Gillingham and Cambridge United between 1958 and 1972. His debut for Bournemouth against Port Vale on 30 April 1958 made him Bournemouth's youngest player at age 15 years and 321 days, a record that still stands. He died at the age of 75 in 2017.

References

1942 births
2017 deaths
English footballers
Gillingham F.C. players
Portsmouth F.C. players
Cambridge United F.C. players
AFC Bournemouth players
People from Parkstone
Footballers from Dorset
Association football central defenders
English Football League players